Radev (Bulgarian: Радев) is a Bulgarian masculine surname, its feminine counterpart is Radeva. It may refer to
Aleksandar Radev (born 1960), Bulgarian boxer
Boyan Radev (born 1942), Greco-Roman wrestler from Bulgaria
Chavdar Radev (born 1959), Bulgarian rower
Desislava Radeva, Bulgarian public figure, wife of Rumen
Devora Radeva (born 1992), Bulgarian figure skater
Dimitar Radev, Bulgarian economist 
Dragomir R. Radev, American professor of computer science 
Geno Radev (born 1946), Bulgarian gymnast
Georgi Radev (born 1994), Bulgarian football defender 
Jordan Radev (born 1976), Bulgarian wrestler and mixed martial artist
Muravey Radev (born 1947), Bulgarian politician 
Nik Radev (1959–2003), Bulgarian-born refugee in Australia
Nikolay Radev (born 1996), Bulgarian football goalkeeper 
Petar Radev (born 1948), Bulgarian ice hockey goaltender
Rumen Radev (born 1963), Bulgarian politician, current President of Bulgaria
Simeon Radev (1879–1967), Bulgarian writer, journalist, diplomat and historian
Radev Point in Antarctica
Sonia Radeva (born 1985), Bulgarian figure skater
Stanislav Radev (born 1987), Bulgarian football defender 
Stoyan Radev, Bulgarian theatre and film director
Tsvetelin Radev (born 1988), Bulgarian football defender 
Vasil Radev (born 1961), Bulgarian rower
Ventsislav Radev (born 1961), Bulgarian track and field athlete 
Viktor Radev (1936–2014), Bulgarian basketball player
Vulo Radev (1923–2001), Bulgarian film director, writer, and cinematographer

Bulgarian-language surnames